The Kuvâ-i İnzibâtiyye was an army established on 18 April 1920 by the imperial government of the Ottoman Empire in order to fight against the Turkish National Movement in the aftermath of World War I. It was commanded by Süleyman Şefik Pasha.

Establishment
Sensing the situation, Sultan Mehmed VI charged his minister of war, Şevket Süleyman Paşa, with the establishment of an irregular force to exterminate the nationalists. Realizing he could no longer count on the title "Sultan" alone to influence the Turkish people, he considered it necessary to use the timeless and spiritual title of "Caliph" for the leader of the army - thus depicting Nationalists not only as the enemies of the Sultanate but also as the enemies of God. The British supported the Kuvâ-i İnzibâtiyye with the aim of enforcing British policy in the region and of stabilizing the remnants of the Ottoman Empire. Supported by the British, the Sultan began a propaganda war throughout the country. Relayed by imams and priests, he urged the Turks to take up arms against the Nationalists of General Kemal, presented as the enemies of God.

Dissolution 
The defeat of the Army of the Caliph, a sign of the end of the influence of the sultan in Turkey, ended the civil war and heralded the beginning of the war of independence against the occupying nations.

See also 
 Kuva-yi Milliye

References

Military units and formations of the Ottoman Empire
1920 in the Ottoman Empire
Militias in Asia
Militias in Europe
Rebellions in Turkey
Military units and formations established in 1920
Military units and formations disestablished in 1920